"State Of The Union" is the debut single from British singer-songwriter David Ford. It had previously been featured as a demo on his official website, before appearing as a track on a CD entitled "Apology Demos EP," only on sale at live shows.

The song was released as a single in the United Kingdom on 26 September 2005 on CD/7" formats through Independiente Records and preceded his debut album I Sincerely Apologise For All The Trouble I've Caused.

The music video received numerous plaudits for its originality. It was recorded live-in-one-take, with David, using a looping machine, playing all 12 instruments used in the song.

Track listing

CD

 "State Of The Union"
 "A Short Song About Shoes"
 "A Short Song About Stars"
 "State Of The Union" (video)

7"
 "State Of The Union"
 "A Short Song About Shoes"

External links

2005 debut singles
2005 songs
Song articles with missing songwriters